Camouflage wz. 68 ("moro" or "mora") was an overprint on cotton fabric in protective colors, which are camouflage, used for sewing military uniforms for soldiers of LWP, militiamen of Milicja Obywatelska, members of Prison Guards, policemen and for the Polish Fire Department. It was produced in 1969-1989. Moro replaced the older camouflage pattern wz. 58, called "deszczyk" (rain, drizzle). Moro was replaced in 1989 by Wz. 89 Puma. Moro is an acronym of the Polish name of the fabric "materiał odzieżowy roboczo-ochronny" which means "clothing textile for work and protection".

Pattern

There were six models of the moro overprint, different by colors according to purpose. In version for land forces, color of marks was green. This model was also used by the Interior Ministry of PRL and by the Border Protection Troops. For the Polish Air Force, Anti-Aircraft Forces and the Polish navy, the color of the marks was black. For Milicja Obywatelska, and also in ZOMO, Prison Guards and Policja - at the beginning was blue, later it was grey-blue. For the Fire Department the color of the marks was dark brown, with bigger speckles, but the first model used in the Fire Department was the same as in the land forces. There was also other pattern than moro for Fire Department. In the 1990s appeared one last version of moro, for the first was used by Policja, but for now it is only used by Prison Guards (one and only user of moro now).

Gallery of pattern variants

References

Camouflage patterns
Military camouflage
Military equipment introduced in the 1960s